Veterans Village, (PSGC: 137404130) more commonly known as Project 7 and Muñoz, is a barangay located in Quezon City with an approximate land area of  bounded by Barangay San Antonio in the Southwest, Roosevelt Avenue in the West, Barangay Bungad in the Southeast and EDSA in the North.

Other neighboring barangays include Bahay Toro, Katipunan, Sto, Cristo, Alicia, Paltok, Phil-Am, Del Monte and Bagong Pag-Asa under the first Legislative district.

History

People’s Homesite and Housing Corporation (PHHC) 

The People's Homesite and Housing Corporation played a major role in the development of Quezon City after the city's inauguration as the nation's Capital on October 22, 1949. It was responsible for the development of the 1,572-hectare land purchased as early as 1938 belonging to the Diliman Estate of the Tuason family. Construction of the Roxas Homesite (originally called Project One) along Diliman creek commenced the series of in-city housing projects namely: Quirino District (Projects 2, 3, and 4); Magsaysay District (Project 6), with the very first “Newsmen row” in the country; Bagong Pag-asa, which was the first informal settlers’ resettlement area; Veterans Village (Project 7); and Toro Hills Homesite (Project 8).

From the original land appropriated to Project 7, PHHC decided to split the area into North Bago Bantay and South Bago Bantay. The northern portion is now Barangay Ramon Magsaysay while the southern part officially becomes Veterans Village after a Quezon City resolution was passed in 1956.

Development of North Edsa corridor 

After the completion of SM City North EDSA as the country's first SM Supermall, the area has developed into a commercial strip of office buildings, car dealerships, a community-based mall, an LRT station and transport hub for commuters going to and from Northern Quezon City, CaMaNava and Bulacan areas.

Notable landmarks (mostly along EDSA and Dangay Street) include Muñoz Market, Congressional Arcade, WalterMart North Edsa mall and corporate offices, Cityland's North Residences Condominium, Panorama Development Corporation's Panorama Technocenter Building, Robinsons Land Corporation-Roxaco Vanguard Hotel Corporation' Go Hotels North Edsa, Eurotel North Edsa, St. Peter Corporate Center, North Metro Hotel Apartelle, Chut's Badminton and Sports Center and service stations of Shell, UniOil, Phoenix Petroleum and PTT.

Some private schools have been established in the vicinity such as St. Augustine School of Nursing, Our Lady of Montichiari School, Castle Ville Academy, Hope Christian Academy as well as government-run Esteban Abada Elementary School and Lukresia Kasilag Senior High School.

A Maynilad joint sewage and septage treatment plant has been in operation at the corner of Road A and Anahaw Extension since October 18, 2013.

Barangay and Sangguniang Kabataan officials

List of Punong Barangay

Members of Sangguniang Barangay

SK Council

The new Barangay and SK Councils were elected on May 14, 2018.

Demographics 
As of the 2020 census of the Philippine Statistics Authority, the population of Barangay Veterans Village is 12,755.

Facilities 
Veterans Village maintains a Quezon City public library branch, Social and Hygiene clinic and recreational facilities such as a barangay sports center and covered basketball court located a few blocks away from the barangay hall.

Places of worship 
Coincidentally, a number of religious places and/or churches are located in the vicinity of EDSA Southbound, Bansalangin and Anahaw streets. These are Word of Hope Church, Pentecostal Missionary Church of Christ, Jesus Is Lord, Church of Christ, Ang Dating Daan – Lokal ng Muñoz, National Shrine of Ina Poon Bato under Apostolic Catholic Church and the Roman Catholic parish church of Christ The King.

Peace and order 
Former barangay Captain De Jesus was sued for gross neglect of duty complaint by MMDA General Manager Thomas Orbos at the Office of the Ombudsman on April 10, 2017. The barangay chief was found careless and indifferent in preventing the return of road obstructions after the MMDA helped the barangay in the clearing operations of illegally parked and junk vehicles in sidewalks 2 months prior.

See also
Barangays of Quezon City
Legislative districts of Quezon City
Vincent Crisologo
Quezon City
Manila LRT Line 1
Barangay elections

References

Quezon City
Barangays of Quezon City
Barangays of Metro Manila